Full Channel, Inc. was an American pay television and telecommunications provider set in Rhode Island. At the time of its acquisition by CountryWide Broadband it was the third-largest  cable television and Internet service provider in the state. Its wired communications network was available to the approximately 50,000 residents of Bristol County, Rhode Island. Full Channel's main office was at 57 Everett Street in Warren, Rhode Island, U.S.

History
In 1965, John Donofrio, a former broadcast engineer and general manager at WPFM (now WLVO) in Providence and sales executive at Charles River Broadcasting in Boston, founded Full-Channel TV, Inc. upon learning of the potential success of Community Antenna Television. Later that year, Donofrio's company applied for and was awarded the first cable television franchise in Rhode Island after his application was approved by the City of East Providence.  However, before Full Channel began construction of a system in East Providence, cable television franchising authority was transferred away from local municipalities to the Rhode Island Public Utilities Commission.  In 1974, Full Channel was among the nine original cable franchises awarded by the PUC and was ultimately assigned to the state's CATV Service Area 5, Bristol County, Rhode Island.  It would not be until 1982 that legal wrangling would allow for the original franchisees to begin building their systems.

In 1982, Full Channel hired a workforce, opened a local business office and began building its cable system.  In the winter of 1983, the company's first cable television subscriber was connected.  The company remained the only cable provider in Bristol County until 2001 when Cox Communications overbuilt Full Channel as part of its bid to service the entire state of Rhode Island.

From Donofrio's death in 2004 until 2018, his daughter Linda Jane Maaia, son-in-law William Maaia and grandson Levi C. Maaia ran the company until the sale of its telecommunications network to CountryWide Broadband for an undisclosed price.

 In 1983 Full Channel became the first cable operator in Rhode Island to deploy analog addressable set-top converters allowing customers to watch pay-per-view events and premium networks
 In 2001 Full Channel begins offering cable modem Internet service
 In 2002 Full Channel begins offering digital TV
  In 2003 Full Channel completes its hybrid fiber-coax and digital system upgrades
 In 2004 Full Channel begins offering local telephone service as a Verizon reseller
 In 2004 After the death of company founder and president John Donofrio, Linda Jane Maaia takes over operations of the company
 In 2008 The company launches its GreenLink wind energy program
 In 2009 CableFAX awards Full Channel its Top Operator award for community service
 In 2011 Full Channel becomes the fourth U.S. cable system to offer Al Jazeera English in its lineup
 In 2011 Full Channel begins offering residential Digital Phone services
 In 2013 Full Channel upgrades its network to DOCSIS 3.0 broadband Internet service
 In 2013 Full Channel launches TV Everywhere platform for on-demand, online viewing of cable TV networks 
 In 2014 Full Channel co-founder and chairwoman Hilda Donofrio passes away
 In 2014 Full Channel begins offering Digital Phone services for businesses
 In 2016 Full Channel retired its analog Expanded TV lineup in favor of all digital transmission
 In 2017 Full Channel announced its intentions to preserve its strict network neutrality and consumer privacy policies despite FCC deregulation of internet service providers.
 In 2018 Full Channel was acquired by CountryWide Broadband 
 In 2019, Full Channel begins offering services under the i3 Broadband name.

References

External links
i3 Broadband's official website

Mass media companies established in 1965
Telecommunications companies established in 1965
Cable television companies of the United States